Romalea is a genus of grasshoppers native to the Southeastern and South-central United States. Its single species is Romalea microptera, known commonly as the eastern lubber grasshopper, Florida lubber, or Florida lubber grasshopper. It is the most distinctive grasshopper species within the Southeastern US, and is well known for its size and its unique coloration.

It is the type genus and species of the relatively new family Romaleidae and tribe Romaleini, and was long known as Romalea microptera before being moved to Romalea guttata. After new research, though, the remaining names (including guttata) have been marked as nomina oblita and microptera takes priority once more.

Lifecycle

R. microptera grows through several stages, like all insects. When in the nymph stage, it is smaller than in the adult stage, wingless, and completely black with one or more yellow, orange, or red stripes. In the adult stage, it reaches , grows wings half the length of its body, and become either a dull yellow often characterized by black spots and markings, a bright orange with black markings, or entirely black (as in the nymph stage) with yellow or red striping. In the black adult color phase, the grasshopper is widely known by the name "diablo" or "black diablo". The insect is also colloquially known as a "graveyard grasshopper". In Mississippi, they are known as the "giant locust".

Range
R. microptera inhabits regions west of North Carolina to Tennessee, in Georgia, Alabama, Mississippi, Louisiana, Arkansas, and Texas, and throughout Florida, Missouri, and Arizona.  They live in open pinewoods, weedy vegetation, and weedy fields.

Size and wings
Their wings are rarely half the length of the abdomen; most of the time, they are much smaller, and cannot be used for flight.

Defense

R. microptera has several defense strategies. The first is its brightly colored pattern (aposematism) to warn predators that it is unpleasant eating. The second is that it emits a foul-smelling and foul-tasting, foamy secretion from its thorax when it is disturbed. The secretion is dark colored and opaque. The final strategy is that it lets off a loud hissing sound which can scare animals.

Research

A quantitative analysis of the distribution of tritium labeled DNA among chromosomes during meiosis in Romalea microptera led to the conclusion that most exchanges reflected breakage and reciprocal exchange between (non-sister) homologous chromatids.

Gallery

References

External links 

Romaleidae
Orthoptera of North America
Insects described in 1817